Women Gladiators (Spanish: Combate de Mujeres) is a painting by Jusepe de Ribera made in oil on canvas. It is conserved in the Museo del Prado, Madrid.

Description
The painting, dated and signed, was made in Naples in 1636, as part of a series of over thirty pictures on the history of Rome commissioned to Giovanni Lanfranco, Domenichino, Ribera himself, and other artists.

Analysis
The painting depicts a legendary episode occurred at Naples in 1552. Two women, Isabella of Carazzi and Diambra of Pottinella, in the presence of the Marquis of the Vast dispute in a duel for the love of a man called Fabio Zeresola. The subject matter of the painting has also been held to be an allegory of the fight between Vice and Virtue.

References

External links

Allegory
1636 paintings
Paintings by Jusepe de Ribera
Baroque paintings